Fayetteville is a village in Perry Township, Brown County, Ohio, United States. The population was 330 at the 2010 census.

History
Fayetteville was founded in 1818 by an Irish immigrant named Cornelius McGroarty. It was later incorporated in 1868. In 1883, Fayetteville contained two churches, two schools, two hotels, several stores and saloons, and two drug stores.

Geography
Fayetteville is located at  (39.186870, -83.932083).

It also rests on a bend of the East Fork Little Miami River.

Demographics

2010 census
As of the census of 2010, there were 330 people, 128 households, and 85 families living in the village. The racial makeup of the village was 99.4% White, 0.3% African American, and 0.3% from other races. Hispanic or Latino of any race were 1.2% of the population.

There were 128 households, of which 39.8% had children under the age of 18 living with them, 49.2% were married couples living together, 11.7% had a female householder with no husband present, 5.5% had a male householder with no wife present, and 33.6% were non-families. 28.9% of all households were made up of individuals, and 12.5% had someone living alone who was 65 years of age or older. The average household size was 2.58 and the average family size was 3.14.

The median age in the village was 36.8 years. 26.4% of residents were under the age of 18; 7.9% were between the ages of 18 and 24; 23.7% were from 25 to 44; 28.2% were from 45 to 64; and 13.9% were 65 years of age or older. The gender makeup of the village was 49.1% male and 50.9% female.

2000 census
As of the census of 2000, there were 372 people, 142 households, and 93 families living in the village. The population density was 742.4 people per square mile (287.3/km2). There were 154 housing units at an average density of 307.3 per square mile (118.9/km2). The racial makeup of the village was 99.46% White, 0.27% African American, and 0.27% from two or more races.

There were 142 households, out of which 33.8% had children under the age of 18 living with them, 52.1% were married couples living together, 10.6% had a female householder with no husband present, and 34.5% were non-families. 26.8% of all households were made up of individuals, and 11.3% had someone living alone who was 65 years of age or older. The average household size was 2.62 and the average family size was 3.28.

In the village, the population was spread out, with 29.0% under the age of 18, 10.8% from 18 to 24, 32.0% from 25 to 44, 19.9% from 45 to 64, and 8.3% who were 65 years of age or older. The median age was 32 years. For every 100 females there were 93.8 males. For every 100 females age 18 and over, there were 94.1 males.

The median income for a household in the village was $34,375, and the median income for a family was $50,000. Males had a median income of $35,694 versus $26,667 for females. The per capita income for the village was $18,717. About 7.6% of families and 8.5% of the population were below the poverty line, including 8.6% of those under age 18 and 15.0% of those age 65 or over.

Education
The village is served by Fayetteville-Perry High School. Fayetteville has a public library, a branch of the Brown County Public Library.

Gallery

References

External links
 Fayetteville-Perry Library
 Fayetteville-Perry Schools

Villages in Brown County, Ohio
Villages in Ohio